Cara is a female given name in several languages. It is of Latin, Greek, and Celtic origin. It has been frequently used mostly in recent times, especially in the 1970s, 1980s and 1990s. and can also be used as a short form for the name Caralee.

Cara is an Irish feminine given name meaning "friend". It is also an English, German and Italian language feminine given name from the Latin  meaning “darling, beloved, dear, loved one”. It is also a Danish, Norwegian and Swedish feminine given name that is an alternate form of Kara as well as a short form of Carola, Carolina, and Oscara.

Cara means beloved in Latin and the names Carina, Cherie and Cheryl derive from it.

Kara, the alternative spelling, is from the Cornish word , meaning love. This is likely cognate to the popular Welsh girls' name Carys.

The name is also that of an island in the Inner Hebrides island group, Scotland; Cara Island lying just off the southern tip of the Isle of Gigha.

In Egyptian language, the term  can be translated as "the spirit of Ra".

In Turkey, the word  means "dark", which may or may not be related to the Gaelic Ciara of the same meaning.

In Greece, the name  means "pure", and is related to the names Katharina, Katherine, and Katrina. In Ancient (and sometimes in modern) Greek language, Kara means Head.

In Japan, the word  means "empty", and is the basis of the name of the Karate martial art.

In Norse mythology,  was a valkyrie; in the Scandinavian languages, the name  either means "the wild, stormy one" (based on Old Norse , meaning "wild") or "curl" or "the curly one" (from Old Norse ).

In Vietnam,  refers to a diamond size unit (translated from carat).

People named Cara

 Cara Judea Alhadeff, artist, writer, and yoga teacher 
 Cara Black, professional tennis player
 Cara Black (author), American mystery writer
 Cara Blue Adams, American author
 Cara Buono, American actress
 Cara Butler, Irish American stepdancer and choreographer
 Cara Capuano, sports anchor for ESPNU
 Cara Carriveau (born 1966), Chicago radio personality
 Cara Delevingne (born 1992), fashion model and actress
 Cara DeLizia (born 1984), American television actress
 Cara Dillon, Irish folk singer
 Cara Duff-MacCormick, Canadian actress
 Cara Dunne-Yates (1970–2004), American scholar-athlete
 Cara Gee (b. 1982) Ojibwe; Canadian actress
 Cara Gorges (born 1987), beauty queen from Clearwater, Kansas
 Cara Heads (born 1977), American Olympic weightlifter
 Cara Hilton, Scottish Labour Party politician and Member of the Scottish Parliament
 Cara Hoffman, New York City-based novelist and journalist
 Cara Horgan, English actress
 Cara Jones, singer, songwriter, and a voice actor
 Cara Knott (1966–1986), American murder victim
 Cara Lockwood, American novelist
 Cara Lott, Adult actress
 Cara Luft, musician
 Cara Pifko (born 1976), Canadian actress
 Cara Quici (born 1985), American singer/songwriter
 Cara Readle (born 1991), Welsh actress
 Cara Seymour (born 1964), English actress
 Cara Theobold (born 1990), English actress
 Cara Tivey, English pianist/keyboardist and vocalist
 Cara Wakelin, Canadian model and actress
 Cara Williams (born 1925), American film and television actress
 Cara Zavaleta, model and reality show guest

See also

Cari (name)
Chara (given name)
Kara (name)

References

Feminine given names
English feminine given names